Armstrong's least gecko (Sphaerodactylus armstrongi), also known commonly as the southern forest geckolet, is a species of lizard in the family Sphaerodactylidae . The species is endemic to the island of Hispaniola.

Etymology
The specific name, armstrongi, is in honor of Lorenzo D. Armstrong, a patron of the American Museum of Natural History who financed the 1932 expedition on which the holotype was collected.

Geographic range
S. armstrongi is found in the Dominican Republic and Haiti.

Habitat

Reproduction
S. armstrongi is oviparous.

References

Further reading
Noble GK, Hassler WG (1933). "Two New Species of Frogs, Five New Species and a Race of Lizards from the Dominican Republic". American Museum Novitates (652): 1–17. (Sphaerodactylus armstrongi, new species, pp. 5–7).
Rösler H (2000). "Kommentierte Liste der rezent, subrezent und fossil bekannten Geckotaxa (Reptilia: Gekkonomorpha) ". Gekkota 2: 28–153. (Sphaerodactylus armstrongi, p. 110). (in German).
Schwartz A, Thomas R (1975). A Check-list of West Indian Amphibians and Reptiles. Carnegie Museum of Natural History Special Publication No. 1. Pittsburgh, Pennsylvania: Carnegie Museum of Natural History. 216 pp. (Sphaerodactylus armstrongi, pp. 144–145).
Schwartz A, Henderson RW (1991). Amphibians and Reptiles of the West Indies: Descriptions, Distributions, and Natural History. Gainesville, Florida: University of Florida Press. 720 pp. . (Sphaerodactylus armstrongi, p. 469).

Sphaerodactylus
Endemic fauna of Hispaniola
Reptiles of the Dominican Republic
Reptiles of Haiti
Reptiles described in 1933
Taxa named by Gladwyn Kingsley Noble